The Humber Bridge, near Kingston upon Hull, East Riding of Yorkshire, England, is a  single-span road suspension bridge, which opened to traffic on 24 June 1981. When it opened, the bridge was the longest of its type in the world; it was not surpassed until 1998, with the completion of the Akashi Kaikyō Bridge, and is now the twelfth-longest.

The bridge spans the Humber (an estuary formed by the rivers Trent and Ouse), between Barton-upon-Humber on the south bank and Hessle on the north bank, connecting the East Riding of Yorkshire with North Lincolnshire. Both sides of the bridge were in the non-metropolitan county of Humberside until its dissolution in 1996. The bridge can be seen for miles around, from as far as Patrington in the East Riding of Yorkshire, and from out to sea miles off the coast. It is a Grade I listed building.

By 2006, the bridge carried an average of 120,000 vehicles per week. The toll was £3.00 each way for cars (higher for commercial vehicles), which made it the most expensive toll crossing in the United Kingdom. In April 2012, the toll was halved to £1.50 each way after the UK government deferred £150 million from the bridge's outstanding debt.

History

Before the bridge, commuters crossed the Humber on the Humber Ferry from Corporation Pier at Hull and New Holland Pier at New Holland, Lincolnshire, or by road via the M62 (from 1976), M18 (from 1979) and M180 motorways, crossing, by way of the Ouse Bridge, the River Ouse near Goole (connected to the Humber). Until the mid-1970s the route south was via the single-carriageway A63 and the A614 (via grid-locked Thorne) where it met the busy A18 and crossed the Stainforth and Keadby Canal at Keadby Bridge, a swing bridge, which formed a bottleneck on the route, and on through Finningley and Bawtry, meeting the east–west A631.

The journey was along straight single-carriageway roads across foggy moors interrupted by bottlenecks for most of the journey to Blyth, Nottinghamshire, where it met the A1, and the accident rate was high. Debates in Parliament were held on the low standard of the route across the windswept plains around Goole. It was not unexpected that under these conditions, a Humber Bridge, with connecting dual-carriageway approach roads and grade-separated junctions, would seem worthwhile. By the time the bridge opened, much of this inferior route had been transformed by dualling of the A63 and its bypasses, extending the M62 and the connecting of the M18 from Thorne to Wadworth. The obvious need for a Humber Bridge had been reduced by the late 1970s with the improvements of the motorway infrastructure in the region. Although welcome, these improvements detracted from the need for vehicles to cross a bridge from Hessle to Barton. The Humber Bridge was a victim of the success of the M62 before it opened. A hovercraft service, Minerva and Mercury, linked Hull Pier and Grimsby Docks from February to October 1969 but suffered relatively frequent breakdowns.

Act of Parliament
Plans for a bridge were drawn up in the 1930s and revised in 1955, but work did not begin until 27 July 1972. The Humber Bridge Act, promoted by Kingston Upon Hull Corporation, was passed in 1959. This established the Humber Bridge Board to manage and raise funds to build the bridge and buy the land required for the approach roads.

1966 Kingston upon Hull North by-election
The allocation of funds proved impossible until the 1966 Kingston upon Hull North by-election. Labour Prime Minister Harold Wilson prevailed upon his Minister of Transport Barbara Castle to sanction the building of the bridge. Dismay at the long wait for a crossing led to Christopher Rowe writing a protest song, "The Humber Bridge".

Design

The consulting engineers for the project were Freeman Fox & Partners (now Arcadis NV). Sir Ralph Freeman had produced the first ideas in 1927 and in the early 1930s the cost of the project was estimated at £1.725 million and that the bridge would be unlikely to recoup the construction or maintenance costs. In 1935 he had an idea for a  suspension bridge for the Humber Tunnel Executive Committee. Sir Gilbert Roberts produced more ideas in 1955 for a bridge with a  central span, costing £15 million, to be paid for by East Riding County Council and Lindsey County Council. When it became likely that a bridge would be constructed, Imperial College-educated Bernard Wex OBE (1922–1990) produced the design in 1964 that was actually built. The bridge was built to last 120 years. In 1985 Wex was awarded the Telford Medal by the Institution of Civil Engineers. In the 1950s he had helped to design High Marnham Power Station. He was a former UK chairman of the International Association of Bridge and Structural Engineers and helped to found the Steel Construction Institute in 1976.

The architect was R. E. Slater ARIBA. The administration building (for the tolls) was designed by Parker & Rosner. The landscaping was designed by Prof Arnold Weddle.

Construction
The main contractor for the steel superstructure was British Bridge Builders (the same grouping as for the Forth and Severn Road Bridges comprising Sir William Arrol & Co., then a unit of NEI Cranes Ltd, Cleveland Bridge & Engineering Company, and Redpath Dorman Long Ltd). The contractor for the concrete towers, anchorages and sub-structure was John Howard & Co Ltd of Chatham, Kent, which was later bought by Amec. Concrete was chosen for the towers, instead of steel, partly due to cost, but also to suit the landscape.

Work began on the southern approach road in July 1972 by Clugston Construction of Scunthorpe. The  approach road to the A1077 junction, by Costain Civil Engineering, began in September 1976. It included a  span from the southern anchorage of seven pre-stressed concrete box sections and the A1077 junction, costing £4.25 million. Work on the bridge substructure (foundations) began in March 1973. To reduce heat of hydration in the concrete, which produces calcium silicate hydrate from belite, as much as 60 per cent of the Portland cement was replaced with ground granulated blast-furnace slag (GGBS). It took longer to build the southern anchorage due to a diaphragm wall design due to there not being enough shallow bedrock. The main southern approach roads from Barton to the M180 motorway junction at Barnetby were built in the late 1970s by Clugston Construction of Scunthorpe, opening in 1978.

The towers were constructed by slipforming and the north tower was completed by May 1974. The southern foundations were completed in September 1975, with the pier completed in March 1976, and the southern tower was completed by September 1976; the bridge had been planned to open in 1976. The northern tower and anchorage was built on solid chalk but the southern tower and anchorage were built on fissured Kimmeridge Clay,  from the southern shore and built with a difficult caisson design. The subcontractor for the concrete was Tileman & Co. of Shipston-on-Stour, south Warwickshire.

Cable spinning took place between September 1977 and July 1979. Each cable weighs , with 37 strands of 404 lengths of cable. The cable on the northern span has four extra strands. The deck is of box girder form, the box sections around  each. The first box sections were assembled in June 1975 and put into the main span on 9 November 1979. The toll buildings and north approach road were built by A. F. Budge of Retford, Nottinghamshire, costing £2.9 million. Work began on the administration building in November 1976. The toll system was manufactured by Plessey Controls of Poole, Dorset. Corrosion resistance on the steelwork was provided by Camrex Corrosion of Bellshill, North Lanarkshire. The road was laid by Tarmac Roadstone of Wolverhampton with mastic asphalt. In 2017, the bridge was designated a Grade I listed building.

A-frames
At road level the deck was fastened to the towers through four rocking A-frames, to allow for movement caused by the catenary supporting the deck from above deflecting with the weight of passing traffic, from thermal expansion, and from changes in wind loading. The devices catered for a maximum deflection of 2 metres. By 2011 it was noticed that the pivot-pin bearings carrying the frames had worn, allowing them to drop towards the support structure. Each frame was replaced by two new components: a vertical linkage to cater for longitudinal movement and a sliding bearing for lateral displacement.

Opening
The bridge opened to traffic on 24 June 1981. It was opened officially by Queen Elizabeth II on 17 July 1981, in a ceremony that included a prayer of dedication by the Archbishop of York and a fly-past by the Red Arrows.

World record

Local benefits

Bridge statistics
The bridge's surface takes the form of a dual carriageway with a lower-level foot and cycle path on both sides. There is a permanent  speed limit on the full length of the bridge.

The towers, although vertical, are  farther apart at the top than the bottom due to the curvature of the earth.

The bridge held the record for the world's longest single-span suspension bridge for 17 years, from its opening in July 1981 until the opening of the Akashi Kaikyō Bridge in April 1998. In 2022 it became the twelfth longest, single-span suspension bridge. It remains the longest single-span suspension bridge in the world that can be crossed on foot or by bicycle.
The bridge is crossed twice during the annual Humber Bridge Half Marathon in June, and Hull Marathon in September.

Toll update project
In July 2013, work began on introducing a new electronic tolling system. The existing Humber Bridge toll system was largely the same as it was when the bridge opened in 1981. The computer system was over 15 years old, absorbed an increasing amount of maintenance, and needed to be replaced. The project would decrease waiting times and was welcomed by business and transport leaders.

In the first phase, the toll booths and the toll plaza canopy were replaced, and in the second phase, writing, testing and setting up the new toll system was completed. From 2015 bridge users could set up an account with the bridge and pay into it. Account holders receive a device called the HumberTAG, a small electronic tag that enables the system to recognise the bridge user; the toll is automatically deducted from the user's account. Two central lanes through the plaza are free-flowing; they do not have booths and account holders are able to cross the bridge without stopping.

Incidents and suicides
During construction of the bridge, the road deck sections were floated up on barges then hoisted into place by cables. During one of these lifting operations some of the cables on two of the road deck sections failed, leaving the sections hanging at an angle. The sections were subsequently installed.

On more than 200 occasions, people have jumped or fallen from the bridge since it was opened in 1981; only five people have survived. Between 1990 and February 2001 the Humber Rescue Team launched its boat 64 times to deal with people falling or jumping off the bridge. Notable incidents include the cases of a West Yorkshire woman and her two-year-old daughter who fell off the bridge in 2005 and that of a man jumping from the bridge to his death on the A63 road below in September 2006.

Plans were announced on 26 December 2009 to construct a suicide barrier along the walkways of the bridge; design constraints were cited as the reason for not installing barriers during the construction of the bridge.

In May 2017, a YouTuber with the username 'Night Scape', along with a small group, illegally scaled the bridge without safety equipment. The group of young men climbed up the structure to the top of the bridge using the suspension wires as handholds. Humberside Police and the Humber Bridge Board are reviewing the security measures.

On 3 April 2021, the Humber Bridge was closed to pedestrians and cyclists following an unspecified 'recent incident'. The decision came after multiple deaths at the bridge in the month of March. Following the death of one individual that month, a petition calling for increased safety measures to 'secure' the bridge had gained thousands of signatures. Concerns were raised over how the change will affect those who commute on foot or by bike. On 6 May 2021, the bridge was reopened to pedestrians and cyclists between the hours of 0500 and 2100; only pre-registered users could use the bridge outside of those hours. In addition, more CCTV and notices were erected, and more staff assigned to patrol the crossing.

Finances
The bridge had a toll charge of £1.50 for cars from 1 April 2012, until for six months it was £3.00 and the only trunk road British toll bridge to charge motorcycles (£1.20). In 2004 many motorcyclists held a slow-pay protest, taking off gloves and helmets and paying the toll in large denomination bank notes.

In 1996, Parliament passed the Humber Bridge (Debts) Act 1996 to reorganise the board's liabilities to ensure the bridge could be safely maintained. Much of the interest on the debt was suspended and deferred in a refinancing which saw no write off – the balance was to be paid using tolls.

In 2006, Shona McIsaac, Labour MP for Cleethorpes, tabled a Private Member's Bill, the Humber Bridge Bill. The Bill would have made amendments to the Act of 1959 "requiring the Secretary of State to give directions to members of the Humber Bridge Board regarding healthcare and to review the possibility of facilitating journeys across the Humber Bridge in relation to healthcare". The aim was to allow patients travelling between the banks for medical treatment to cross without paying the toll and to allow the Secretary of State for Transport to appoint two members of the board to represent the interests of the NHS. Even though the Bill received cross-party support (it was co-sponsored by Shadow Home Secretary David Davis and supported by all other MPs representing North Lincolnshire and the East Riding of Yorkshire) it ran out of time later that year.

A protest at the bridge on 1 September 2007 was supported by the local Cancer Patients Involvement Group, the Road Haulage Association, Diana Wallis (MEP for Yorkshire and the Humber) and local business and council representatives. The government responded to the petition on 14 January 2008, stating that "Concessions or exemptions from tolls on the Humber Bridge are a matter for the Humber Bridge Board".

In October 2008, a joint campaign was launched by the Scunthorpe Telegraph, Hull Daily Mail and Grimsby Telegraph to abolish the toll. The papers' campaign, A Toll Too Far, was launched after a mooted increase in the toll, receiving much support from councillors and MPs serving Lincolnshire and the East Riding of Yorkshire. The campaign was to stave off a potential increase, secure a reduction to £1.00 and ultimately to be abolished. Thousands of readers backed the campaign with a paper and an online petition.

A public inquiry into the tolls was held in March 2009 by independent inspector Neil Taylor. In July 2009, the Department for Transport announced that it had decided not to allow the proposed increase. Transport Minister Sadiq Khan said he did not believe it was right for the tolls to be raised in the current economic climate. In October 2009, the government approved a £6 million grant for maintenance costs, which meant that there would be no toll increase before 2011 at the earliest, by which time tolls would have been frozen for five years.

The board applied again to the Department of Transport in September 2010, to raise the tolls from April 2011 but the government ordered a public inquiry into the application. A three-day public inquiry was held in Hull in early March 2011. Following the recommendation by the planning inspector, the government gave approval, on 14 June 2011, for the increase. The toll was raised on 1 October 2011, at which point it became the most expensive in the United Kingdom. The Severn Bridge/Second Severn Crossing charged £5.70 for Wales-bound traffic.

In the 2011 Autumn Statement on 29 November, the Chancellor of the Exchequer, George Osborne, announced that the government had agreed to reduce the debt on the bridge by £150 million, which would allow the toll for cars to be halved to £1.50. Following the government accepting the agreement, between the four local councils, to meet a portion of the debt if revenues proved insufficient, the Transport Secretary, Justine Greening, confirmed the reduction on 29 February 2012, with effect from April.

Image gallery

References

External links

 Humber Bridge Board
 Humber Rescue, based underneath the bridge
 

Bridges completed in 1981
Bridges in Lincolnshire
Bridges in the East Riding of Yorkshire
Concrete bridges in the United Kingdom
Hessle
Humber
Humberside
Borough of North Lincolnshire
Suspension bridges in the United Kingdom
Toll bridges in England
Transport in Kingston upon Hull
Tourist attractions in the East Riding of Yorkshire
World record holders
Grade I listed bridges
Grade I listed buildings in the East Riding of Yorkshire
Grade I listed buildings in Lincolnshire